The 2004 RLIF Awards were presented on Monday November 22, 2004. The separate Rugby League World Golden Boot Award were incorporated into the proceedings.

External links
 Rugby League International Federation
 RLIF Official forums

RLIF Awards
RLIF Awards
RLIF Awards